Side by Side is the 29th studio album by Christian music vocal group The Imperials, released in 1983 on DaySpring Records. It is the Imperials' first double album to feature each member taking a solo side. On lead singer Paul Smith's side, it features a duet between Smith and a new female CCM singer-songwriter named Leslie Phillips on the track "Make My Heart Your Home." Phillips had just released her debut album Beyond Saturday Night that same year. In 1984, the album was nominated for a Grammy Award for Best Gospel Performance by a Duo or Group at the 26th Grammy Awards and at the 15th GMA Dove Awards, the group won their final Dove Award for Pop/Contemporary Album of the Year. Side by Side peaked at number 10 on Billboards Top Inspirational Albums chart.

Track listingJim Murray; produced by Neal JosephDavid Will; produced by Neal Joseph and Keith ThomasArmond Morales; produced by Neal JosephPaul Smith''; produced by Keith Thomas

 Personnel The Imperials Paul Smith – lead vocals, backing vocals (17, 20)
 Jim Murray – tenor, lead vocals
 David Will – baritone, lead vocals
 Armond Morales – bass, lead vocalsMusicians Mitch Humphries – acoustic piano (1-5), Rhodes Chroma (1)
 Dick Tunney – Fender Rhodes (1, 2, 3, 5), Wurlitzer electric piano (4)
 Keith Thomas – acoustic piano (6, 7, 9, 10), backing vocals (6-9, 17), Fender Rhodes (7, 8, 10), synthesizers (8, 10, 17), keyboards (16, 18, 19, 20), vocoder (16, 17)
 David Huntsinger – acoustic piano (11, 13, 14), Fender Rhodes (11-14)
 Alan Steinberger – synthesizers (11, 12)
 Tricia Walker – acoustic piano (15)
 Jon Goin – guitars (1-5, 11, 12, 17, 19, 20), guitar solo (8)
 Dann Huff – lead guitar (6), guitars (8, 9, 16, 18, 19, 20), "midget" guitar (16), guitar solo (17)
 Bruce Dees – guitars (6, 10), electric guitar (7)
 Brent Rowan – guitars (6, 10, 13, 14, 15), acoustic guitar (7)
 Mike Brignardello – bass (1-5, 8, 9, 20)
 Bob Wray – bass (6, 7, 10)
 Gary Lunn – bass (11-15)
 David Hungate – bass (16)
 Jimmie Lee Sloas – bass (17, 18, 19)
 Mark Hammond – drums (1, 2, 3, 5, 8, 16)
 Larrie Londin – drums (7, 9-14, 17, 19)
 David Huff – drums (18)
 Farrell Morris – percussion (1-5, 11-15)
 Terry McMillan – percussion (6, 8, 9, 16-19)
 Sam Levine – saxophone solo (10)
 Mark Douthit – saxophone (19)
 Bobby Taylor – oboe (15)
 Cindy Reynolds – harp (15)
 Terry Mead – flugelhorn (16)
 Ronn Huff – string arrangements (1, 2, 3, 5)
 Alan Moore – string arrangements (7, 9, 10)
 Don Hart – string arrangements (12, 13, 15)
 John Darnall – string arrangements (18, 20)
 The Kris Wilkinson Strings – strings (1, 2, 3, 5, 7, 9, 10, 12, 13, 15, 18, 20)
 Beverly Darnall – backing vocals (1, 2, 4, 9)
 Neal Joseph – backing vocals (1, 2, 4, 7, 8, 12)
 Melodie Tunney – backing vocals (1, 2, 4, 7, 9, 12, 14, 20)
 Steve Green – backing vocals (6, 7, 8)
 Gary Pigg – backing vocals (6)
 Beverly Baxter – backing vocals (12)
 Donna McElroy – backing vocals (14, 19)
 Steve Taylor – backing vocals (14)
 Marty McCall – backing vocals (17, 19)
 Leslie Phillips – lead vocals (18)
 Patti Leatherwood – backing vocals (19)
 Denny Henson – backing vocals (20)Production Neal Joseph – producer (1-15)
 Keith Thomas – producer (11-20)
 Jeff Balding – engineer 
 Scott Hendricks – engineer 
 Jim Baird – engineer (1-15)
 Travis Turk – engineer (1-5, 16-20)
 Steve Fralick – engineer (6-10, 16-20)
 Brent King – engineer (6-15)
 Danny Mundhenk – engineer (6-10), assistant engineer (11-20)
 Kyle Lehning – engineer (16-20)
 Lee Groitzsch – assistant engineer (6-10)
 Phil Diehl – assistant engineer (11-20)
 Hank Williams – mastering at MasterMix (Nashville, Tennessee)
 Bill Brunt – album design 
 Mark Tucker – photography

 Charts 

Radio singles

AccoladesGMA Dove Awards'''

References

1983 albums
The Imperials albums
Word Records albums